Mireille Granelli is a retired French film actress.

Selected filmography
 Beatrice Cenci (1956)
 Noi siamo le colonne (1956)
 Les Truands (1956)
 Mimi Pinson (1958)
 Hercules, Prisoner of Evil (1964)
 Mission to Caracas (1965)

References

Bibliography
 Hughes, Howard. Cinema Italiano: The Complete Guide from Classics to Cult. I.B.Tauris, 2011.

External links

1936 births
Living people
French film actresses
Actresses from Paris